Henry Colley may refer to:

 Henry Colley (MP for Monaghan)
 Henry Colley (died 1584), Irish soldier and landowner
 Henry Colley (died 1719) (1648–1719), MP for County Kildare
 Henry Colley (died 1723) (c. 1685–1723/24), MP for Strabane
 Harry Colley (1891–1972), Irish Fianna Fáil politician